Initiative 692 (I-692 or the Medical Use of Marijuana Act) was an initiative in the November 1998 election in the U.S. state of Washington.  The initiative was to permit patients with certain debilitating conditions to use medical marijuana.  Voters approved this initiative by 59%.

Text of initiative 
Ballot Title
Shall the medical use of marijuana for certain terminal or debilitating conditions be permitted and physicians authorized to advise patients about medical use of marijuana?

Yes [ ] 
No  [ ] 

Ballot Measure Summary
This measure would permit the medical use of marijuana by patients with certain terminal or debilitating conditions. Non-medical use of marijuana would still be prohibited. Physicians would be authorized to advise patients about the risks and benefits of the medical use of marijuana. Qualifying patients and their primary caregivers would be protected from prosecution if they possess marijuana solely for medical use by the patient. Certain additional restrictions and limitations are detailed in the measure.

Election results

In addition to passing statewide, the initiative also passed in every individual county in Washington state except the following: Adams, Cowlitz, Garfield, Grant, Klickitat, Lewis, Lincoln, Stevens, and Yakima.

Campaign organization 
The campaign to pass I-692 was funded by a California-based non-profit organization called Americans for Medical Rights.  This group was funded by businessmen George Soros, John Sperling, and Peter Lewis.

See also 
 Washington Initiative 1068 (2010)
 Washington Initiative 502 (2011)

References

External links
 Complete text of I-692

Cannabis ballot measures in the United States
1998 in Washington (state)
Initiative 692
1998 cannabis law reform